

Belgium
Belgian Congo – Pierre Ryckmans, Governor-General of the Belgian Congo (1934–1946)

France
 French Somaliland – Pierre Marie Elie Louis Nouailhetas, Governor of French Somaliland (1940–1942)
 Guinea – Antoine Félix Giacobbi, Governor of Guinea (1940–1942)

Japan
 Karafuto – Masayoshi Ogawa, Governor-General of Karafuto (9 April 1940 – 1 July 1943)
 Korea – Jirō Minami, Governor-General of Korea (1936–1942)
 Taiwan – Kiyoshi Hasegawa, Governor-General of Taiwan (16 December 1940 – December 1944)

Portugal
 Angola – 
 Manoel da Cunha e Costa Marquês Mano, High Commissioner of Angola (1939–1941)
 Abel de Abreu Souto-Maior, High Commissioner of Angola (1941–1942)

United Kingdom
 Aden – Sir John Hathorn Hall, Governor of Aden (1940–1945)
 Malta Colony – William Dobbie, Governor of Malta (1940–1942)
 Northern Rhodesia
 Sir John Alexander Maybin, Governor of Northern Rhodesia (1938–1941)
 William Marston Logan, acting Governor of Northern Rhodesia (1941)
 Sir Eubule John Waddington, Governor of Northern Rhodesia (1941–1947)

Colonial governors
Colonial governors
1941